The 2018 H1 Unlimited season is the sixty-third running of the H1 Unlimited series for unlimited hydroplanes, sanctioned by the APBA.

Teams and drivers 

Note: Ṫ—The U-3 is the only piston powered boat in the fleet, powered by a dual turbocharged Allison V-12.

Season Schedule and Results

National High Points Standings

References 

H1 Unlimited
H1 Unlimited seasons
Hydro
Hydro